Robert Howard "Pinkie" Davie (September 12, 1912 in Beausejour, Manitoba – October 27, 1990) was a Canadian professional ice hockey defenceman who played 41 games in the National Hockey League with the Boston Bruins in the mid 1930s.

Career statistics

Regular season and playoffs

External links 

1912 births
1990 deaths
Boston Bruins players
Boston Cubs players
Canadian ice hockey defencemen
Ice hockey people from Manitoba
Minneapolis Millers (AHA) players
People from Eastman Region, Manitoba
Springfield Indians players
Winnipeg Monarchs players